Ivan Wani Adebo Levi (born 12 December 1998), known as Ivan Wani, is a South Sudanese footballer who plays as a midfielder for Uganda Premier League club Busoga United FC and the South Sudan national team.

International career
Wani has already played for the South Sudan national football team.

References

1998 births
Living people
People with acquired South Sudanese citizenship
South Sudanese footballers
Association football midfielders
South Sudan international footballers
Ugandan footballers
Maroons FC players
Uganda Premier League players
Ugandan people of South Sudanese descent
People from Kalangala District